Dimov may refer to:

Dimov (surname)
Ivan Dimov (village) in Bulgaria
Dimov Gate in Antarctica